Saint-Denis-de-Pile is a commune in the Gironde department in Nouvelle-Aquitaine in southwestern France. It is situated approximately 9 kilometres (6 mi) north of Libourne on the eastern side of the river Isle.

Geographie 
The commune borders in the North and West are set by the river Isle. Saint-Denis-de-Pile borders the commune Sablons in the North, Abzac in the Northeast, Les Artigues-de-Lussac and Montagne in the Southeast, Lalande-de-Pomerol in the South, Savignac-d’Isle in the West und Bonzac in the Nortwesr.

Population

See also
 Communes of the Gironde department

References

Communes of Gironde